"Lost" is a song by Irish singer-songwriter and musician Dermot Kennedy. It was released as a single on 6 February 2019 as the third single from his debut studio album Without Fear. The song peaked at number 26 on the Irish Singles Chart. The song was written by Carey Willetts and Dermot Kennedy.

Critical reception
Claire Rowden from MTV gave the song a positive review stating, "What we love about Dermot's music is that he really makes his listeners feel heard, and seen, and this song is no exception to that. Pulling us in with his original and raspy voice, and then making us fall in love with his lyricism - he’s an artist unlike any other, and this song is proof of it."

Music video
A music video to accompany the release of "Lost" was first released onto YouTube on 17 April 2019.

Charts

Certifications

Release history

References

2019 songs
2019 singles
Dermot Kennedy songs
Songs written by Carey Willetts
Songs written by Dermot Kennedy